Burk Castle is a levelled medieval motte and bailey castle in the area known as Beim Schanzbach, about 550 metres south-southwest of the church in Burk, a village in the borough of Forchheim in the county of Forchheim in the south German state of Bavaria.

Nothing has survived of the castle which was mentioned in the records in 1127.

Literature

See also 
 List of German motte and bailey castles

External links 
 

Castles in Bavaria
Forchheim
Motte-and-bailey castles